Sir John Michael Fleetwood Fuller, 1st Baronet,  (21 October 1864 – 4 September 1915) was a British Liberal Party politician and colonial administrator.

Fuller was the eldest son of George Fuller, of Neston Park, Corsham, Wiltshire, and his wife Emily Georgina Jane, daughter of Sir Michael Hicks Beach, 8th Baronet, and was educated at Winchester and Christ Church, Oxford.

He unsuccessfully contested Parliament three times but in 1900 he was successfully returned for Westbury. He served under Sir Henry Campbell-Bannerman as a Junior Lord of the Treasury from 1906 to 1907 and under Campbell-Bannerman and later H. H. Asquith as Vice-Chamberlain of the Household from 1907 to 1911. He was created a Baronet, of Neston Park in Corsham in the County of Wiltshire, in 1910.

The following year Fuller resigned his seat in the House of Commons on his appointment as Governor of Victoria. He remained in this position until his resignation for health and family reasons in November 1913. He had been appointed a Knight Commander of the Order of St Michael and St George in the 1911 Coronation Honours.

Fuller married Norah Jacintha, daughter of Charles Nicholas Paul Phipps, in 1898. They had two sons and four daughters. He died in September 1915, aged only 50, and was succeeded in the baronetcy by his eldest son Gerard. Lady Fuller later remarried and died in 1935.

Electoral record

References

 
 
 Australian Dictionary of Biography Online Edition

External links
 

1864 births
1915 deaths
Alumni of Christ Church, Oxford
Baronets in the Baronetage of the United Kingdom
Knights Commander of the Order of St Michael and St George
Liberal Party (UK) MPs for English constituencies
UK MPs 1900–1906
UK MPs 1906–1910
UK MPs 1910
UK MPs 1910–1918
People educated at Winchester College
People from Corsham